Barton "Buzz" Thompson is an American lawyer and academic who focuses on climate, ecosystem services and conservation, freshwater, oceans and sustainable development.

Thompson is currently the Robert E. Paradise Professor in Natural Resources Law at Stanford University.

References

Stanford University faculty
American lawyers
Stanford University alumni
Living people
Year of birth missing (living people)